Belgium competed at the 1956 Summer Olympics in Melbourne, Australia and Stockholm, Sweden (equestrian events). 54 competitors, 51 men and 3 women, took part in 37 events in 12 sports.

Medalists

Silver
 André Nelis — Sailing, Men's Finn Individual Competition 
 Joseph Mewis — Wrestling, Men's Freestyle Featherweight

Athletics

Men's Marathon 
Aurèle Vandendriessche — 2:47:18 (→ 24th place)

Boxing

Canoeing

Cycling

Sprint
Evrard Godefroid — 10th place

Time trial
Evrard Godefroid — 1:16.5 (→ 19th place)

Team pursuit
André BarFrançois De WagheneireGuillaume Van TongerlooGustaaf De Smet — 5th place

Team road race
Norbert VerougstraeteGustaaf De SmetFrançois Vandenbosch — 89 points (→ 7th place)

Individual road race
Norbert Verougstraete — 5:26:47 (→ 23rd place)
Gustaaf De Smet — 5:26:47 (→ 24th place)
François Vandenbosch — 5:38:16 (→ 42nd place)
François De Wagheneire — did not finish (→ no ranking)

Fencing

Six fencers, all men, represented Belgium in 1956.

Men's foil
 André Verhalle
 Ghislain Delaunois
 François Dehez

Men's team foil
 Jacques Debeur, Ghislain Delaunois, Marcel Van Der Auwera, André Verhalle

Men's épée
 Ghislain Delaunois
 Jacques Debeur
 Roger Achten

Men's team épée
 François Dehez, Roger Achten, Ghislain Delaunois, Marcel Van Der Auwera, Jacques Debeur

Men's sabre
 Marcel Van Der Auwera

Hockey

Rowing

Belgium had seven male rowers participate in three out of seven rowing events in 1956.

 Men's double sculls
 Fernand Steenacker
 Henri Steenacker

 Men's coxless pair
 Bob Baetens
 Michel Knuysen

 Men's coxed pair
 Livien Ven
 Antoon Ven
 Jos Van Thillo (cox)

Sailing

Shooting

Two shooters represented Belgium in 1956.

50 m pistol
 Marcel Lafortune

50 m rifle, three positions
 Frans Lafortune

50 m rifle, prone
 Frans Lafortune

Swimming

Weightlifting

Wrestling

References

External links
Official Olympic Reports
International Olympic Committee results database

Nations at the 1956 Summer Olympics
1956
1956 in Belgian sport